Crypsicometa ochracea is a moth of the family Geometridae first described by Inoue in 1971. It is found in Taiwan.

The wingspan is 28–30 mm.

References

Moths described in 1971
Baptini